Murder in Cuba is classified into three major categories: murder with special circumstances, murder, and manslaughter.

Categories

Murder with Special Circumstances
Murder with special circumstances includes:
 murder of the president, vice president, a politician, police officer, any member of the military, or for children under the age of 14;
 murder committed in the commission of any violent felony, such as kidnapping, robbery, arson, or burglary; or
 murder of multiple persons.

Murder with special circumstances is punishable by a maximum term of life imprisonment, or by the death penalty.

Murder
Premeditated or non-premeditated intentional murder is punishable by a maximum term of 30 years.

Manslaughter
Manslaughter is non-intentional homicide. It is punishable by between 7 and 25 years in prison.

See also
List of murder laws by country

Murder in Cuba
Cuba
Law of Cuba